The political slogan "Workers of the world, unite!" is one of the rallying cries from The Communist Manifesto (1848) by Karl Marx and Friedrich Engels (literally , but soon popularised in English as "Workers of the world, unite! You have nothing to lose but your chains!"). A variation of this phrase ("Workers of all lands, unite") is also inscribed on Marx's tombstone. The essence of the slogan is that members of the working classes throughout the world should cooperate to defeat capitalism and achieve victory in the class conflict.

Overview 

Five years before The Communist Manifesto, this phrase appeared in the 1843 book The Workers' Union by Flora Tristan.

The International Workingmen's Association, described by Engels as "the first international movement of the working class" was persuaded by Engels to change its motto from the League of the Just's "all men are brothers" to "working men of all countries, unite!". It reflected Marx's and Engels' view of proletarian internationalism.

The phrase has overlapping meanings: first, that workers should unite in unions to better push for their demands such as workplace pay and conditions; secondly, that workers should see beyond their various craft unions and unite against the capitalist system; and thirdly, workers of different countries have more in common with each other than workers and employers of the same country.

The phrase was used by the Industrial Workers of the World (IWW) in their publications and songs and was a mainstay on banners in May Day demonstrations. The IWW used it when opposing World War I in both the United States and Australia.

The slogan was the Soviet Union's state motto (Пролетарии всех стран, соединяйтесь!; Proletarii vsekh stran, soyedinyaytes'!) and it appeared in the State Emblem of the Soviet Union. It also appeared on 1919 Russian SFSR banknotes (in Arabic, Chinese, English, French, German, Italian and Russian), on Soviet ruble coins from 1921 to 1934 and was the slogan of Soviet newspaper Pravda. 

Some socialist and communist parties continue using it.

Variations
In the first Swedish translation of The Communist Manifesto, published in 1848, the translator Pehr Götrek substituted the slogan with Folkets röst, Guds röst! (i.e. Vox populi, vox Dei, or "The Voice of the People, the Voice of God"). However, later translations have included the original slogan.

The guiding motto of the 2nd Comintern congress in 1920, under Lenin's directive, was "Workers and oppressed peoples of all countries, unite!". This denoted the anti-colonialist agenda of the Comintern, and was seen as an attempt to unite racially-subjugated black people and the global proletariat in anti-imperialist struggle.

In other languages

This slogan was used by several socialist states and communist parties as their official motto.

Motto of the Soviet Union 
In each Soviet republic, the same motto was used in the local language.

Motto of other countries

Motto of communist parties 
The English phrase and its variants (the variant "All power to the workers" is used by some parties such as the Communist Party of Australia) are used by communist parties in the English-speaking world. The list below does not include the mottos of communist parties of the above countries or in languages listed above.

See also 

 Communist society
 From each according to his ability, to each according to his needs
 Labour movement
 Proletarian internationalism
 Social patriotism
 World communism
 World revolution
 Emblem of the Soviet Union

Notes

References

External links 

 Manifesto of the Communist Party by Karl Marx and Friedrich Engels. Translated by  Samuel Moore in cooperation with Frederick Engels, 1888.
 Chapter 4 of The Communist Manifesto.
 Collection of Quotes by Karl Marx

1840s neologisms
Communism
Marxism
National mottos
Political catchphrases
Political quotes
Quotations from literature
Quotations from philosophy
de:Liste geflügelter Worte/P#Proletarier aller Länder, vereinigt euch!